Jacob Shaw is a fictional character in Marvel Comics, created by Ben Raab and Charlie Adlard. He is only about 4 feet tall, a human mutate, and a member of the Hellfire Club. He also is the father of Sebastian Shaw (the Black King of the Hellfire Club and an enemy of the X-Men).

Fictional character biography

Jacob Shaw was the ambitious son of Cornelius Shaw,  Brigadier General in the British Army, and the younger brother of Lieutenant Esau Shaw. In 1915, after the death of their father, Esau was offered his father's place in the Hellfire Club Inner Circle by Sir Waltham Pierce and Sir Harry Manners, a position Jacob coveted.

One night Jacob met Mister Sinister, who, for reasons unknown, granted him the power of shapeshifting. With this new power, Jacob took the form of Pierce and murdered Esau, hoping that with Esau dead, the Hellfire Club would seek Jacob to take his father's place. However, Jacob was never invited into the Inner Circle, as Montgomery Falsworth (Union Jack) arrested Waltham Pierce on the grounds of treason and murder. Shaw, who had approached Pierce disguised as a seductive woman and was in bed with Pierce and another woman when Union Jack appeared, attacked both Pierce and Union Jack with a gun and escaped into the snow. As he fled, he assumed his true form, which Union Jack managed to recognize.

Eventually, Jacob Shaw fled to Pennsylvania in the United States, where his son Sebastian was born. In his old age, Jacob contracted an incurable blood disease due to the alteration of his genetic code. He died just when Sebastian had obtained a scholarship to study engineering.

Prior to his death, Jacob gave his son a machine and told him to keep it with him.

Reception
 In 2019, CBR.com ranked Jacob Shaw 2nd in their "X-Men: The 5 Deadliest Members Of The Hellfire Club (& The 5 Weakest)" list.

References

Marvel Comics characters who are shapeshifters
Shaw
Shaw
Shaw
Shaw
Shaw